Lucky Elephant Pink Candy Popcorn is a Canadian confection that has been on the snack food market since the 1950s. It is commonly found retailed at mom and pop grocery stores, carnivals, concession stands, arenas and neighbourhood food outlets, and more recently is being launched in major grocery outlets across Canada.

Description

Lucky Elephant Pink Candy Popcorn is sold in 70g boxes and comes with a small prize inside. The popcorn is caramelized with a pink candy coating. Unlike Cracker Jack, the product does not contain peanuts.

Lucky Elephant Pink Candy Popcorn is a Canadian confection (nostalgic / retro) snack that has been on the snack food market since the 1950s. Not widely available in mainstream grocery stores or large convenience store chains, the treat is more commonly found retailed at mom and pop grocery stores, carnivals, concession stands, arenas and neighbourhood food outlets.

Manufacturer
Lucky Elephant Pink Candy Popcorn is produced and distributed by Poppa Corn Corp. of Toronto, Ontario.

See also

 List of popcorn brands

References

External links
official website
distributor
 Proper Popcorn

Popcorn brands
Canadian snack foods
Products introduced in 1950